Go West! A Lucky Luke Adventure is a 2007 French animated western comedy film directed by Olivier Jean-Marie from a screenplay penned by Jean-Marie and Jean-François Henry with the kind collaboration of Anne Goscinny, who's one of the associate producers of the film and the daughter of René Goscinny. Based on the 2001–03 animated television series The New Adventures of Lucky Luke (which in turn is based on the Franco-Belgian comic series of the same name by Morris) and loosely based on La Caravane by Morris and René Goscinny, the film was produced by Xilam, France 3 Cinéma, Pathé, Dargaud Média and Lucky Comics, and was released theatrically in France by Pathé Distribution on 5 December 2007.

Plot
In New York City 1880, the Dalton brothers (Joe, Jack, William and Averell) escape from a court trial regarding the Daltons' bank salesman cousin disgracing their name and plunder several banks across New York, while Lucky Luke hunts for them. Upon placing their loot of stolen cash in an empty wagon at Central Park, New York, which was in construction at the moment, and attempting to blend in with the crowd in order to avoid detection from the police, Averell unwittingly blows their cover in front of the police, resulting in a wild police chase across New York.

After the chase, the Daltons head back to Central Park in order to retrieve their loot, only to find more wagons with immigrants going to California. Lucky Luke arrives to captured the Daltons when Piotr, the leader of the immigrants from the wagon train, welcomes lucky Luke and later on exposes their problem to them: They have 80 days to go to California and to take possession of their land if not the developer, a man named Crook, having put 12 caravans in danger so that they do not arrive in California with his partner Bartleby, keeps the money paid in advance without the sale being made. With that in mind, along with Joe convincing him to help them just to stay and find the loot, Lucky Luke wants to take the safe route to California, but since the immigrants got 80 days to get there and the safe route would take about 6 months, he instead decides to take them through the unsafe route, which takes them through a small town called Hole Gutch, crossing the Deadly Desert of Death, and passing through the Indian tribe of the Crazy Wolves.

Among the other immigrants headed for California include a Chinese chef couple, a teacher with unruly children named Miss Littletown, a trash-talking driver for a pack of mules that transport the Daltons and a barber among others. Along the way, Crook and Bartleby sow traps in order to prevent the caravans from going to California, but to no avail. Crook then later on tries to get the Daltons escaped but Joe refuses until he find the loot in the wagons. Later, Lucky Luke and the caravans stop at Hole Gutch, where they pick up some new immigrants who also want to go to California including Rantanplan. During this, after failing another attempt on freeing the Daltons, Crook drained the water for the settlers who were thirsty in the Deadly Desert of Death. Joe tries to make the settlers have a union against Lucky Luke but Averell does a crazy rain dance by accident, all because of a cockroach was in his shoe, even told three roaches how bad it was in Averell's shoe.

When they get close to California within 24 hours, Crook makes one final trick to blow up the old bridge between the canyon using a cannon from the circus, same one that he brought the gators from when trying to stop Lucky Luke near the Missouri river which failed to see the gators turned into accessories. With the next bridge being far away for 6 days to travel, Miss Littletown suggested to turn the wagons into hot air balloons and fly over the canyon. With some of the wagons now in the air, almost for the furnal wagon, the water wagon, and the Chinese chef's wagon being made of ladies' underwear, Lucky Luke and the immigrants made it to California and take possession of their land only to discover that they get the bad side of California, showing it to be an old gold mine. Realizing Crook tricked them and that he has done a dozen of settlers fail to get to California, the settlers plans to hang him high but before they do, Joe promised them some money they hid in their wagons earlier. However, Averell already found them after they picked up the other immigrants in Hole Gulch and hide the loot hidden in their ball and chains. This changes Joe's mind but not the settlers.

The Daltons flee with their stock in an abandoned gold mine, resulting in a chase in the form of a roller coaster ride between the settlers, Lucky Luke, Rantanplan and Crook. Finally, after all of them leave the mine, while Lucky Luke saved Miss Littletown and her students, the Daltons are defeated by Luke but Crook arrived with a stick of dynamite, demanding to give them the loot the Daltons in the balls. Suddenly, as Crook makes his escape, a mega explosion was caused by the dynamite now fetched by Rantanplan, destroying the loot the Daltons stole and allows the settlers to discover gold under the sold lands. The film ends with the Daltons, Crook and Bartleby being tied up and sent to justice by Lucky Luke into the sunset.

Voice cast

French
 Lambert Wilson as Lucky Luke
 Clovis Cornillac as Joe Dalton
 Alexis Tomassian as William Dalton
 Christophe Lemoine as Jack Dalton
 Bernard Alane as Averell Dalton
 François Morel as Rantanplan
 Edgar Givry as Edgar Crook
 Michael Lonsdale as Harold Bartleby
  as Piotr/Monsieur Tang
 Dee Dee Bridgewater as Molly  
 Jean Piat as Spike Goodfellow/Le Croque-Mort  
 Titoff as Monsieur Pierre
 Dorothée Pousséo as Miss Littletown/L'Institutrice
 François Seiner as Ugly Barrow
  as Louise/La Jument
  as Jolly Jumper
 Jacques Frantz as Loup Cinglé
 Pierre Baton as Old Timer
 Yves-Robert Viala as Le Policier à New-York
 Jacques Obadia as Le Directeur du cirque
 Marc Alfos as Le Costaud du Saloon
  as L'Avocat de L'accusation
 Julien Chatelet as Morris/Goscinny/Un Pionnier
  as Barman/Shérif
 Jean-Marc Pannetier as Le Cissier de la Banque
 Luc Boulad as Vrai Faucon
 Sylvain Corthay as Le Juge

Québec
 Stéphane Rousseau as Lucky Luke
 André Ducharme as Joe Dalton/Jolly Jumper
 Éveline Gélinas as Miss Littletown
  as Louise
  as Monsieur Pierre
 Yves Pelletier as Jack Dalton/Piotr/Rantanplan/Monsieur Tang
 Bruno Landry as Averell Dalton/Barrow/Loup Cinglé
 Guy A. Lepage as William Dalton/Crook
  as Bartleby

English
 Marcel Jeannin as Lucky Luke/Rantanplan
 Mark Camacho as Jolly Jumper
 TBA as Jack Dalton/Willam Dalton/Joe Dalton

Video game
A video game based on the film was developed by Tate Interactive and published by Atari Europe in 2007 for the Nintendo Wii, Nintendo DS and Microsoft Windows.

References

External links
 

2007 films
2000s French animated films
2000s Western (genre) comedy films
2000s adventure comedy films
2000s children's animated films
2000s comedy road movies
2007 animated films
2007 comedy films
Alliance Films films
Animated adventure films
Animated comedy films
Animated films based on animated series
Animated films based on comics
Western (genre) animated films
Films based on television series
Films produced by Marc du Pontavice
Films set in 1880
Films set in California
Films set in New York City
Films with live action and animation
French Western (genre) comedy films
French adventure comedy films
French animated films
French children's films
French comedy road movies
Lucky Luke films
Pathé films
Treasure hunt films
Xilam films
France 3 Cinéma films
French-language Canadian films
2000s English-language films